Chinese Turks may refer to:
Turks in the Tang military
Chinese Tatars
Few of several states ruled by ethnically Turkic families during the Five Dynasties and Ten Kingdoms period of China 
Later Tang
Later Jin
Later Han
Salars, Uyghurs, Western Yugurs, Kazakh, Kyrgyz and other ethnic groups in China that speak Turkic languages